Baseball was featured at the 2020 Summer Olympics, in Tokyo, for the first time since the 2008 Summer Olympics. Six national teams competed in the tournament: Israel, Japan (host), Mexico, South Korea, the United States, and the Dominican Republic.

Baseball/softball was one of five sports that were added to the programme of the 2020 Summer Olympics only. It will not return in 2024. The tournament was originally scheduled to be held in 2020, but on 24 March 2020, the Olympics were postponed to 2021 due to the COVID-19 pandemic. As a result, the games were played behind closed doors.

Medalists

Qualification

Six national teams qualified for the Olympic baseball tournament. Japan automatically qualified, as the host nation. Israel qualified by winning the September 2019 Europe/Africa continental tournament. 

Two teams qualified through the 2019 WBSC Premier12 tournament in November 2019. South Korea qualified as the best-placed team from the Asia/Oceania region (other than Japan, which already qualified as host), while Mexico qualified as the best-placed team from the Americas. 

The United States qualified by winning the Americas Qualifying Event that was originally scheduled to take place in March 2020, but was postponed to May/June 2021 because of the COVID-19 pandemic. The final spot was awarded to the Dominican Republic which won a world Final Qualifying Tournament in late June 2021.

Competition schedule

Team squads

Competition format
The small number of teams in the tournament resulted in an unusual competition format being adopted that featured 16 games. There was an opening group round-robin round, and a modified double-elimination bracket.

For the group round, there were two pools of three teams each. Each team played the other two teams in its pool once. A total of six games were played in the group round.

In the knockout round, the first three games featured teams that each finished in the same position in their respective pools (A1 vs B1, A2 vs B2, A3 vs B3). The loser of the A3 vs. B3 game was eliminated (with only one loss in the elimination round, plus one or two in the group stage). After this, play continued in double-elimination format until there is one team left in each of the winners and losers brackets. Those two teams played in the gold medal game (a single game; the losers bracket representative does not need to beat the winners bracket representative twice). The last two teams eliminated from the losers bracket played in the bronze medal game. In total, 10 games are played in the knockout round:

 A3 vs B3 (loser eliminated)
 A2 vs B2
 Winner of #1 vs Winner of #2
 A1 vs B1
 Loser of #2 vs Loser of #3 (loser eliminated)
 Loser of #4 vs Winner of #5 (loser to bronze medal game)
 Winner of #3 vs Winner of #4 (winner to gold medal game)
 Loser of #7 vs Winner of #6 (winner to gold medal game, loser to bronze medal game)
 Bronze medal game: Loser of #6 vs Loser of #8
 Gold medal game: Winner of #7 vs. Winner of #8

Thus, the best two teams from group play face each other in the quarterfinals, with a possible rematch later in the tournament (including the gold medal game, if the winner also wins its next game and the loser wins its next two).

Group stage
The schedule was announced on 28 June 2021. Note that "Qualification" column represents positional seeding in the knockout stage, effective at the conclusion of the group stage.

All times are local (UTC+9).

Group A

Group B

Knockout stage

Bracket

Round 1

Round 2

Round 1 repechage

Round 2 repechage

Semifinals

Bronze medal game

Gold medal game

Final standings

All-Olympic team 

Selected by the World Baseball Softball Confederation (WBSC).

See also
Softball at the 2020 Summer Olympics

References

External links
 Results book

 
2020
2020 Summer Olympics events
2020 Summer Olympics
Olympics
Olympics
Olympics